The Transylvania Times is an American, English lanuage bi-weekly newspaper in Transylvania County, North Carolina, in the United States, and its surrounding area. The paper was founded in 1887, and is family-owned and operated. It provides news coverage for Brevard, Pisgah Forest, Rosman and Lake Toxaway, as well as the townships of Cathey's Creek, Dunn's Rock, Eastatoe, Gloucester, Hogback and Little River. The paper has a circulation of approximately 7,700 and averages about 15,000 readers per print edition.

Weekly features include Church News, School News, Sports, Arts and Entertainment, Senior Citizens News and Opinions of the Readers. The Transylvania Times has funded and supported many community improvement initiatives.

History
E.S. Warrack published the first edition of the newspaper on July 1, 1887, under the name The Transylvania Pioneer. It was later known as The French Broad Hustler in the early 1890s and as The Sylvan Valley News in 1895. The paper was purchased by Ora Jones in 1911. Jones sold the paper in 1916 to Nowell Hollowell who changed the name to The Brevard News. Charles Douglas bought it in 1931 and changed the name to The Transylvania Times. The paper was purchased in 1941 by Ed M. Anderson. It has been in the Anderson family ever since and today is published by Stella Anderson Trapp.  The current publisher is Times Pub. Co.

Awards
The Transylvania Times has won numerous writing, advertising and photography awards from the North Carolina Press Association and the National Newspaper Association, most recently including:.
 2019, 3rd Place, Editorial Page
 2019, 2nd Place, Sports Feature Writing

References

Newspapers published in North Carolina
Transylvania County, North Carolina
Publications established in 1887